John Henry Ringham (10 February 1928 – 20 October 2008) was a British actor who appeared on both television and stage. Among his roles was that of Norman Warrender in the 1980s sitcom Just Good Friends.

Early life
Ringham was born in Cheltenham, where his father was a travelling book salesman. He was educated at the Cheltenham Grammar School for Boys (now called Pate's Grammar School). As a teenager he was a member of a drama group run by a retired professional actor. He was then called up for National Service and served from 1946 until 1948 in Mandatory Palestine.

After leaving the army he spent four years as a member of a touring theatre company called The Compass Players based in Gloucestershire.

Career
He appeared throughout BBC Television's Shakespeare adaptation An Age of Kings in 1960, most prominently as Humphrey Duke of Gloucester, the brother of Henry the Fifth. Other appearances over the years include several parts in Z-Cars; Softly, Softly, and Barlow at Large; Flambards; Poldark; the War and Peace dramatisation in 1972; Birds of a Feather; The Bill; Bless Me Father; Taggart; Bergerac; The Tripods; Juliet Bravo; Minder; All Creatures Great and Small; Dixon of Dock Green; Dad's Army; Are You Being Served?; Catweazle; Up Pompeii!; The Avengers; The Piglet Files, When the Boat Comes In, London's Burning and Some Mothers Do 'Ave 'Em.

Ringham played Inspector Lanner in the 1985 Sherlock Holmes adaptation of The Resident Patient.
In Dad's Army he played two different characters – Private Bracewell in the pilot (he was set to become a major recurring character, but this was later dropped), then Captain Bailey in four later episodes.

He appeared in the long-running show Doctor Who three times, first as the bloodthirsty priest Tlotoxl in the story The Aztecs (1964). He returned in the stories The Smugglers (1966) and Colony in Space (1971).

Ringham also appeared as the by-the-book Commander Tri-S in the unsold pilot of The Solarnauts, created by Roberta Leigh (1967).

Playwright and author
He was also a playwright and the author of three books, including a biography of the composer George Frideric Handel.

Death
Ringham died of cancer in 2008 aged 80.

Filmography

References

External links
 
 Obituary in The Independent
 John Ringham(Aveleyman)

1928 births
2008 deaths
20th-century British Army personnel
British male television actors
Male actors from Gloucestershire
People educated at Pate's Grammar School
People from Cheltenham